In re Madden, 151 F.3d 125 (3d Cir. 1998), is a decision from the Third Circuit Court of Appeals that established the Madden test, a test used to determine whether an individual is a journalist with standing to claim journalist's privilege.

In re Madden was an appeal by Titan Sports, now known as World Wrestling Entertainment, Inc., in the case Titan Sports, Inc. v. Turner Broad. Sys., Inc. Titan, the parent company of World Wrestling Entertainment, at the time known as the World Wrestling Federation, had sought to discover anonymous sources used by Mark Madden, an employee of World Championship Wrestling (WCW), which at the time had Turner Broadcasting Systems, Inc. as its parent company. Madden, citing his journalist's privilege, refused to disclose the names of the sources during his deposition. The District Court upheld his right to the privilege under Pennsylvania's shield law. Titan appealed the initial ruling, and the Court of Appeals reversed, finding that Madden was an entertainer and not a journalist.

Known as the Madden test, the Court said that an individual may be afforded a journalist's privilege if he can prove he is (1) engaged in investigative reporting, (2) is gathering news, and (3) possessed the intent at the inception of the news-gathering process to disseminate the news to the public.

See also
First Amendment to the United States Constitution
Branzburg v. Hayes
Von Bulow v. von Bulow

References

External links

United States Free Speech Clause case law
United States Court of Appeals for the Third Circuit cases
1998 in United States case law
WWE
World Championship Wrestling
Turner Broadcasting System
Sources (journalism)